Parliamentary elections were held in North Korea on 22 April 1990. 687 deputies were elected to the ninth Supreme People's Assembly.

Results
Of the 687 deputies, workers accounted for 37 percent, farmers 10 percent, and women 20 percent. Deputies whose ages were below 35 represented a rate of 3 percent. Those who were between 36 and 55 represented a rate of 57 percent, and those who were over 55 represented a rate of 40 percent. Among those elected were Kim Il-sung and Kim Jong-il.

Aftermath
The first session was on 24–26 May 1990. It concerned the formation of the National Defence Commission and on the agenda was "Let Us Bring the Advantages of Socialism in Our Country into Full Play."

References

Further reading
 – full list of elected members

Elections in North Korea
Parliamentary
North Korea
Supreme People's Assembly
North Korea
Election and referendum articles with incomplete results